Paul Langton (April 17, 1913 – April 15, 1980) was an American actor perhaps best known for his role as Leslie Harrington on the television series Peyton Place.

Langton was born in  Salt Lake City, Utah, and attended Lowell High School and the California School of Fine Arts in San Francisco, California. His early stage experience included acting in productions of the Mountain Play Association in California.

Making his movie bow in 1941, Langton became a contract player at Metro-Goldwyn-Mayer, frequently appearing in war films. Later, Langton was seen in character parts or supporting roles in such films as The Incredible Shrinking Man (1957). He also was a voice actor on Lux Radio Theatre from 1942 to 1954.

Langton began appearing on television in 1951 in a series called The Web. His first regular role was that of Walter Dennis on the daytime series The Brighter Day. He also made five guest appearances on Perry Mason from 1958 to 1962, three of which were as prosecuting attorneys. But it was the role of Leslie Harrington on the prime time serial Peyton Place (1964–68) that finally gave him a level of stardom. After he was written out of the series, he appeared in half a dozen other programs including It Takes a Thief (1968), Ironside (TV series) and, in his final role, Emergency!, before retiring due to ill health.

He died of a heart attack in Burbank, California in 1980, two days before his 67th birthday. Langton was a Mormon.

Filmography

Notes

References
 The Soap Opera Encyclopedia, Christopher Schemering 
 Performers' Television Credits, 1948–2000, David M. Inman

External links
 
 
 
 
 The Paul Langton papers at the American Heritage Center

1913 births
1980 deaths
20th-century American male actors
American Latter Day Saints
American male film actors
American male television actors
Male actors from Greater Los Angeles
Male actors from Salt Lake City
Metro-Goldwyn-Mayer contract players